The FIDE Grand Prix 2014–15 was a series of four chess tournaments that formed part of the qualification cycle for the World Chess Championship 2016. Fabiano Caruana finished first, and Hikaru Nakamura second in the overall standings. Both therefore qualified for the 2016 Candidates Tournament.

Format
In contrast to the two previous Grand Prix cycles the number of tournaments was decreased from six to four, and players played three tournaments instead of four. As a result, no results were discarded, but each tournament result counted toward the total points. Sixteen players were selected to compete in the tournaments.

Each tournament was a 12-player, single round-robin tournament. In each round players scored 1 point for a win, ½ point for a draw and 0 for a loss. Grand Prix points were then allocated according to each player's standing in the tournament: 170 Grand Prix points for first place, 140 for second place, 110 for third place, and then 90 down to 10 points by steps of 10. In case of a tie in points the Grand Prix points are shared evenly by the tied players.

Players
The Grand Prix consists of 16 players. FIDE announced 11 qualifiers as per regulations, plus one nominee from each of the four organisers, and one FIDE President nominee.

Five original invitees declined to participate: Magnus Carlsen, Viswanathan Anand, Levon Aronian, Vladimir Kramnik and Veselin Topalov. The first four of these had also declined to participate in the FIDE Grand Prix 2012–13. In a later interview, Aronian said "I found it quite insulting to compete in a tournament with the first prize half as large as my participation fee [for] almost any other tournament [at] that time." Moreover, there was no prize money for overall standings, as there had been in previous Grand Prixes.

All five Grand Prix replacements were determined by the rating list as per regulations.

The final list of players was announced on 9 September 2014. Iranian player Ehsan Ghaem-Maghami was replaced by Georgian Baadur Jobava after the third stop was moved from Tehran to Tbilisi.

Prize money and Grand Prix points
The prize money is €120,000 per single Grand Prix (down from €170,000) and there is no financial bonus for the overall standings (€420,000 last in 2012–13).

Tie breaks
With the objective of determining qualifiers to play in the Candidates 2016, and in the case that two or more players have equal cumulative points at the top, the following criteria were utilized to decide the overall Series winner and other overall placings:
 Number of actual game result points scored in the three tournaments entered.
 Number of games played with black.
 Number of wins.
 Number of black wins.
 Drawing of lots.

Schedule
The third stop was initially to be played in Tehran, Iran but a move was announced in October. The fourth stop moved from Moscow to Khanty-Mansiysk.

Events crosstables

Baku 2014
{| class="wikitable" style="text-align:center;"
|+ 1st stage, Baku, Azerbaijan, 1–15 October 2014
! !! Player !! Rating !! 1 !! 2 !! 3 !! 4 !! 5 !! 6 !! 7 !! 8 !! 9 !! 10 !! 11 !! 12 !! Total !! SB !! TPR !! GP
|-
|-style="background:#ccffcc;"
| 1 || align=left |  || 2844
| * || ½ || 1 || 0 || 1 || ½ || ½ || ½ || 1 || ½ || 0 || 1 || 6½ ||  ||  || 155
|-
|-style="background:#ccffcc;"
| 2 || align=left |  || 2748
| ½ || * || ½ || 1 || ½ || ½ || ½ || 1 || 0 || ½ || 1 || ½ || 6½ ||  ||  || 155
|-
| 3 || align=left |  || 2767
| 0 || ½ || * || ½ || ½ || ½ || 1 || ½ || ½ || ½ || ½ || 1 || 6 ||  ||  || 82
|-
| 4 || align=left |  || 2797
| 1 || 0 || ½ || * || ½ || ½ || ½ || 0 || ½ || 1 || ½ || 1 || 6 ||  ||  || 82
|-
| 5 || align=left |  || 2732
| 0 || ½ || ½ || ½ || * || ½ || ½ || ½ || 1 || ½ || ½ || 1 || 6 ||  ||  || 82
|-
| 6 || align=left |  || 2701
| ½ || ½ || ½ || ½ || ½ || * || ½ || ½ || ½ || ½ || 1 || ½ || 6 ||  ||  || 82
|-
| 7 || align=left |  || 2764
| ½ || ½ || 0 || ½ || ½ || ½ || * || ½ || ½ || 1 || 1 || ½ || 6 ||  ||  || 82
|-
| 8 || align=left |  || 2726 
| ½ || 0 || ½ || 1 || ½ || ½ || ½ || * || ½ || ½ || ½ || ½ || 5½ ||  ||  || 50
|-
| 9 || align=left |  || 2764
| 0 || 1 || ½ || ½ || 0 || ½ || ½ || ½ || * || ½ || ½ || ½ || 5 ||  ||  || 35
|-
| 10 || align=left |  || 2706
| ½ || ½ || ½ || 0 || ½ || ½ || 0 || ½ || ½ || * || 1 || ½ || 5 ||  ||  || 35
|-
| 11 || align=left |  || 2722
| 1 || 0 || ½ || ½ || ½ || 0 || 0 || ½ || ½ || 0 || * || 1 || 4½ ||  ||  || 20
|-
| 12 || align=left |  || 2751 
| 0 || ½ || 0 || 0 || 0 || ½ || ½ || ½ || ½ || ½ || 0 || * || 3 ||  ||  || 10
|}

Tashkent 2014
{| class="wikitable" style="text-align:center;"
|+ 2nd stage, Tashkent, Uzbekistan, 20 October – 3 November 2014
! !! Player !! Rating !! 1 !! 2 !! 3 !! 4 !! 5 !! 6 !! 7 !! 8 !! 9 !! 10 !! 11 !! 12 !! Total !! SB !! TPR !! GP
|-
|-style="background:#ccffcc;"
| 1 || align=left |  || 2722
| * || 1 || ½ || 1 || ½ || 1 || ½ || ½ || ½ || ½ || ½ || ½ || 7 ||  ||  || 170
|-
| 2 || align=left |  || 2764 
| 0 || * || ½ || ½ || ½ || ½ || ½ || ½ || ½ || 1 || 1 || 1 || 6½ ||  ||  || 125 
|-
| 3 || align=left |  || 2764
| ½ || ½ || * || 1 || ½ || ½ || ½ || ½ || ½ || ½ || ½ || 1 || 6½ ||  ||  || 125
|-
| 4 || align=left |  || 2717
| 0 || ½ || 0 || * || ½ || 1 || ½ || ½ || ½ || ½ || 1 || 1 || 6 ||  ||  || 75 
|-
| 5 || align=left |  || 2757
| ½ || ½ || ½ || ½ || * || ½ || 1 || ½ || ½ || 0 || 1 || ½ || 6 ||  ||  || 75 
|-
| 6 || align=left |  || 2767 
| 0 || ½ || ½ || 0 || ½ || * || ½ || ½ || 1 || 1 || 1 || ½ || 6 ||  ||  || 75
|-
| 7 || align=left |  || 2844
| ½ || ½ || ½ || ½ || 0 || ½ || * || ½ || ½ || 1 || ½ || 1 || 6 ||  ||  || 75
|-
| 8 || align=left |  || 2726
| ½ || ½ || ½ || ½ || ½ || ½ || ½ || * || ½ || ½ || ½ || ½ || 5½ ||  ||  || 50
|-
| 9 || align=left |  || 2768 
| ½ || ½ || ½ || ½ || ½ || 0 || ½ || ½ || * || ½ || ½ || ½ || 5 ||  ||  || 40
|-
| 10 || align=left |  || 2747
| ½ || 0 || ½ || ½ || 1 || 0 || 0 || ½ || ½ || * || ½ || ½ || 4½ ||  ||  || 30
|-
| 11 || align=left |  || 2706
| ½ || 0 || ½ || 0 || 0 || 0 || ½ || ½ || ½ || ½ || * || ½ || 3½ ||  ||  || 15
|-
| 12 || align=left |  || 2748
| ½ || 0 || 0 || 0 || ½ || ½ || 0 || ½ || ½ || ½ || ½ || * || 3½ ||  ||  || 15
|}

Tbilisi 2015
{| class="wikitable" style="text-align:center;"
|+ 3rd stage, Tbilisi, Georgia, 14–28 February 2015
! !! Player !! Rating !! 1 !! 2 !! 3 !! 4 !! 5 !! 6 !! 7 !! 8 !! 9 !! 10 !! 11 !! 12 !! Total !! SB !! TPR !! GP
|-
|-style="background:#ccffcc;"
| 1 || align=left |  || 2716
| * || ½ || ½ || 1 || ½ || ½ || 1 || 1 || 1 || 1 || ½ || ½ || 8 ||  ||  || 170 
|-
| 2 || align=left |  || 2733
| ½ || * || ½ || ½ || ½ || 1 || ½ || ½ || ½ || 1 || ½ || ½ || 6½ ||  ||  || 140
|-
| 3 || align=left |  || 2731
| ½ || ½ || * || ½ || ½ || ½ || ½ || 1 || ½ || ½ || ½ || ½ || 6 ||  ||  || 110
|-
| 4 || align=left |  || 2705
| 0 || ½ || ½ || * || ½ || ½ || 1 || 0 || ½ || ½ || 1 || ½ || 5½ ||  ||  || 75
|-
| 5 || align=left |  || 2726
| ½ || ½ || ½ || ½ || * || ½ || ½ || ½ || ½ || 0 || ½ || 1 || 5½ ||  ||  || 75
|-
| 6 || align=left |  || 2797
| ½ || 0 || ½ || ½ || ½ || * || ½ || ½ || ½ || ½ || 1 || ½ || 5½ ||  ||  || 75
|-
| 7 || align=left |  || 2759
| 0 || ½ || ½ || 0 || ½ || ½ || * || 1 || 1 || 0 || ½ || 1 || 5½ ||  ||  || 75
|-
| 8 || align=left |  || 2810
| 0 || ½ || 0 || 1 || ½ || ½ || 0 || * || ½ || 1 || ½ || ½ || 5 ||  ||  || 40
|-
| 9 || align=left |  || 2775
| 0 || ½ || ½ || ½ || ½ || ½ || 0 || ½ || * || 1 || ½ || ½ || 5 ||  ||  || 40
|-
| 10 || align=left |  || 2696
| 0 || 0 || ½ || ½ || 1 || ½ || 1 || 0 || 0 || * || 1 || ½ || 5 ||  ||  || 40
|-
| 11 || align=left |  || 2739
| ½ || ½ || ½ || 0 || ½ || 0 || ½ || ½ || ½ || 0 || * || 1 || 4½ ||  ||  || 20
|-
| 12 || align=left |  || 2737
| ½ || ½ || ½ || ½ || 0 || ½ || 0 || ½ || ½ || ½ || 0 || * || 4 ||  ||  || 10
|}

Khanty-Mansiysk 2015
{| class="wikitable" style="text-align:center;"
|+ 4th stage, Khanty-Mansiysk, Russia, 14–26 May 2015
! !! Player !! Rating !! 1 !! 2 !! 3 !! 4 !! 5 !! 6 !! 7 !! 8 !! 9 !! 10 !! 11 !! 12 !! Total !! SB !! TPR !! GP
|-
|-style="background:#ccffcc;"
| 1 || align=left |  || 2738
| * || ½ || 1 || 0 || ½ || 0 || ½ || 1 || 1 || ½ || ½ || 1 || 6½ ||  ||  || 140
|-
|-style="background:#ccffcc;"
| 2 || align=left |  || 2799
| ½ || * || ½ || ½ || ½ || ½ || ½ || ½ || ½ || ½ || 1 || 1 || 6½ ||  ||  || 140
|-
|-style="background:#ccffcc;"
| 3 || align=left |  || 2803
| 0 || ½ || * || ½ || ½ || ½ || 1 || ½ || ½ || 1 || ½ || 1 || 6½ ||  ||  || 140
|-
| 4 || align=left |  || 2734
| 1 || ½ || ½ || * || ½ || 1 || ½ || ½ || ½ || ½ || 0 || ½ || 6 ||  ||  || 85
|-
| 5 || align=left |  || 2744
| ½ || ½ || ½ || ½ || * || 1 || ½ || ½ || ½ || ½ || ½ || ½ || 6 ||  ||  || 85
|-
| 6 || align=left |  || 2734
| 1 || ½ || ½ || 0 || 0 || * || ½ || 1 || ½ || 0 || 1 || ½ || 5½ ||  ||  || 55
|-
| 7 || align=left |  || 2780
| ½ || ½ || 0 || ½ || ½ || ½ || * || ½ || 1 || ½ || ½ || ½ || 5½ ||  ||  || 55
|-
| 8 || align=left |  || 2776
| 0 || ½ || ½ || ½ || ½ || 0 || ½ || * || ½ || 1 || 1 || ½ || 5½ ||  ||  || 55
|-
| 9 || align=left |  || 2753
| 0 || ½ || ½ || ½ || ½ || ½ || 0 || ½ || * || 1 || ½ || 1 || 5½ ||  ||  || 55
|-
| 10 || align=left |  || 2749
| ½ || ½ || 0 || ½ || ½ || 1 || ½ || 0 || 0 || * || 1 || ½ || 5 ||  ||  || 30
|-
| 11 || align=left |  || 2699
| ½ || 0 || ½ || 1 || ½ || 0 || ½ || 0 || ½ || 0 || * || ½ || 4 ||  ||  || 20
|-
| 12 || align=left |  || 2754
| 0 || 0 || 0 || ½ || ½ || ½ || ½ || ½ || 0 || ½ || ½ || * || 3½ ||  ||  || 10
|}

Grand Prix standings
Grand Prix points in bold indicate a tournament win. Green indicates qualifiers of the 2016 Candidates Tournament

References

External links
FIDE Grand Prix: Official site
Baku Grand Prix: Official site
Tashkent Grand Prix: Official site
Tbilisi Grand Prix: Official site
Khanty-Mansiysk Grand Prix: Official site

FIDE Grand Prix
2014 in chess
2015 in chess